The Granada Public Library is a public library located in Granada, Spain.

See also 
 List of libraries in Spain

References

External links 
 Granada Public Library

Buildings and structures in Granada
Libraries in Andalusia
Public libraries in Spain